Yuri Sergeyevich Solntsev (born 6 June 1980) is a Russian football coach and a former professional footballer. He made his debut in the Russian Premier League in 2004 for FC Shinnik Yaroslavl. Currently, he works as a manager with  newly established FC Dynamo St. Petersburg.

External links
  Profile at Footballfacts

FC Dynamo Saint Petersburg managers
1980 births
Living people
Russian footballers
Association football midfielders
FC Lada-Tolyatti players
FC Shinnik Yaroslavl players
Russian Premier League players
FC Volga Nizhny Novgorod players
FC Tosno players
FC Dynamo Saint Petersburg players
FC Oryol players
FC Torpedo Moscow players
FC Dynamo Vologda players
Russian football managers
FC Spartak Kostroma players
FC Zenit-2 Saint Petersburg players
FC Nosta Novotroitsk players